The 80th Group Army ), formerly the 26th Group Army, is a military formation of the Chinese People's Liberation Army Ground Forces (PLAGF). The 80th Group Army is one of twelve total group armies of the PLAGF, the largest echelon of ground forces in the People's Republic of China, and one of three assigned to the nation's Northern Theater Command.

History

Korean War
It was composed of the 76th, 77th, and 78th Divisions, and was augmented by the 88th Division from its parent unit, the 30th Army.

During the Korean War, the 26th Army was commanded by Lieutenant General Zhang Renchu.

The PLA's 9th Army Group began moving into Korea on 5 November. After the 20th Army had moved in, followed by the 27th Army, the 26th CCF Army followed, moving east to Linjiang and Huchang as army group reserve, and defending against any advance down the Yalu River by the US Army 7th Infantry Division. On 2 December, General Song Shilun ordered the 26th Army south from the Huchang River to take over the attack on Hagaru-ri. Movement of the 26th Army was slowed and delayed by air attacks. Further, according to one of the Chinese histories, some elements got lost in a snowstorm. The 26th Army failed to reach Hagaru and launch an attack on the 5th Marines. Advanced elements did reach East Hill and attempt to hold that. And, on the night of December 6, as the 1st Marine Division was attacking towards Hagaru-ri, advance elements of the 26th Army did attack the column but failed to organize a coordinated attack. The 26th Army suffered some 10,000 cold-weather related casualties.

Tiananmen Square Protests of 1989
In May 1989, the 26th Army’s 138th Infantry Division was airlifted to Beijing to enforce martial law and suppress the Tiananmen Square protests of 1989.

Dennis Blasko wrote in 2013 that during the force reductions which began in 2003, the 138th and 199th Brigades, along with the 8th Artillery Brigade, were created from former divisions.  The 83rd Division has also been associated with this army in public reporting in the last few years.

Organization 
In 2013 Dennis Blasko estimated the army comprises the:
77th Motorized Infantry Brigade (Haiyang, Shandong)
138th Motorized Infantry Brigade (Laiyang, Shandong)
199th Motorized Infantry Brigade (Zibo, Shandong)
8th Armored Division (Weifang, Shandong)
8th Artillery Brigade (Weifang, Shandong)
Air Defense Brigade (Jinan, Shandong)
7th Army Aviation Regiment (Liaocheng, Shandong)
'Mighty Eagle' Special Operations Dadui (Laiwu, Shandong)

References 

80
80
Military units and formations established in 1949
Northern Theater Command
Jinan Military Region
Weifang